Mario Rossi (29 March 1902, Bitetto – 29 June 1992, Rome) was an Italian conductor, noted for his solid and meticulous readings of a repertory ranging from Italian classics to Russian moderns such as Prokofiev, to the German operatic classicist Christoph Willibald Gluck.

He studied composition in Rome with Respighi and conducting with Giacomo Setaccioli, graduating in 1925, and soon after graduation he took up the post of assistant conductor to Bernardino Molinari. Appointed resident conductor of the Maggio Musicale Fiorentino in Florence (1937–46), he made his debut on the podium there in 1937 with Mascagni's Iris. The following year he led the premiere of Gian Francesco Malipiero's opera Antonio e Cleopatra.

He conducted in all the major opera houses of Italy. As well as establishing himself in the standard Italian repertory, he took  part in many revivals of ancient works such as Galuppi's Il filosofo di campagna, Monteverdi's Il ritorno d'Ulisse in Patria, and Piccinni's La buona figliuola.

From 1946 till 1969 he served as chief conductor of the orchestra of the RAI in Turin. He elevated this group to an international level, making guest appearances in Brussels (1950), Vienna, (1951), and Salzburg (1952). Amongst his performances on record were Il matrimonio segreto, Il barbiere di Siviglia, Don Pasquale, Un ballo in maschera, Otello, and Falstaff.

Sources

 Le guide de l'opéra, Roland Mancini & Jean-Jacques Rouveroux, (Fayard, 1986) 

1902 births
1992 deaths
Italian male conductors (music)
20th-century Italian conductors (music)
20th-century Italian male musicians